Paraguaçu is a municipality in the state of Minas Gerais in Brazil. The population is 21,605 (2020 est.) in an area of 424 km². The elevation of the municipal seat is 825 m.  It became a municipality in 1911.

Paraguaçu is part of the IBGE statistical microregion of Alfenas.  It is west of Alfenas and is linked by highway BR-491.  The distance is 25 km.  
Other distances are:
São Paulo: 315 km
Belo Horizonte: 330 km 
Rio de Janeiro: 427 km

Neighboring municipalities are Campos Gerais, Três Pontas, Eloi Mendes, Cordislândia, Machado, Alfenas and Fama.

The climate is mainly mild with rains in the months of September to April.  The average annual rainfall is  1,200 millimeters.  The average annual temperature is 21 °C, the average minimum is 13 °C, and the average maximum is 28 °C.

The main economic activities are agriculture and livestock raising, with production of coffee and dairy products.  There are also textile industries.  The main crops are coffee (7,000 ha. in 2006), corn (5,500 ha.) and modest production of potatoes, rice, and beans.

In 2006 there were 685 rural properties with a total agricultural area of 20,977 ha. of which about half was planted in crops.  The landholding system can be characterized as minifundio.

See also
List of municipalities in Minas Gerais
Paraguaçu Paulista

References

External links
Site of the city government

Municipalities in Minas Gerais